Tandler is a surname. Notable people with the surname include:

Adolf Tandler (1875–?), American film score composer and conductor of the Los Angeles Symphony Orchestra
Hans Tandler (1901–1959), Austrian footballer
Julius Tandler (1869–1936), Austrian physician and Social Democratic politician